Kenneth Watson may refer to:
 Kenneth Watson (actor), British television actor
 Kenneth Albert Watson, British businessman in Hong Kong
 Kenneth Bowman Watson, Canadian World War I flying ace
 Kenneth M. Watson, theoretical physicist and physical oceanographer
 Kenny Watson (American football), American football running back
 Kenny Watson (cricketer), South African cricketer
 Kenny Watson (footballer), Scottish footballer
 Ken Watson, Canadian curler